Al Lewis (born Abraham Meister; April 30, 1923 – February 3, 2006) was an American actor and activist, best known for his role as Count Dracula-lookalike Grandpa on the television series The Munsters from 1964 to 1966 and its film versions. He previously also co-starred with The Munsters’s Fred Gwynne in the television show Car 54, Where Are You?  from 1961–1963. Later in life, he was a restaurant owner, political candidate, and radio broadcaster.

Early life
Lewis was born Abraham Meister on April 30, 1923 in Manhattan; the son of Alexander Meister, house painter and immigrant from Minsk, Belarus, and Ida Neidel, garment worker and immigrant from the Russian Empire; his family was Jewish. Two brothers were Phillip and Henry. He had originally given his birth year as 1910. His reputed early radio work in the mid-1930s would indicate the earlier birth date, as did an off-the-cuff remark on the TVLegends interview, 2002, where he says "not a bad memory for 92". Ted Lewis, his son, firmly said his father was born in 1923 in Brownsville, Brooklyn, New York. Other sources placed his birth in Wolcott, New York, but no official record of his birth has been published to date (2006), and officials in Wolcott say they have no record of any Meister. The Times wrote: "Lewis was born Albert Meister, probably in 1923, but he insisted that he was born in 1910. This, and Lewis's many other questionable stories, means that much of the actor's life is a broth of conjecture that his fans will no doubt squabble over for years to come." On his application for a Social Security number, completed sometime between 1936 and 1950, Lewis gave his date of birth as April 30, 1923. The 1940 census lists an Albert Meister "age 16" living on Douglass (today's Strauss) Street in Brooklyn, New York.

In a 1998 interview with Walt Shepperd, Lewis said:My mother was a worker, worked in the garment trades. My mother was an indomitable spirit. My grandfather had no sons. He had six daughters. They lived in Poland or Russia, every five years it would change. My mother being the oldest daughter, they saved their money, and when she was about sixteen they sent her to the United States, not knowing a word of English. She went to work in the garment center, worked her back and rear-end off and brought over to the United States her five sisters and two parents. I remember going on picket lines with my mother. My mother wouldn't back down to anyone.* The New Times

Education
According to a report in The Jewish Week, Al Lewis attended Yeshiva Chaim Berlin in Brooklyn, New York, in his youth and "asked annoying questions to the teachers." Lewis then attended Thomas Jefferson High School, which he left in his junior year. He claimed to have attended Oswego State Teachers College (now SUNY Oswego), notwithstanding his lack of a high school diploma, and to have earned a Ph.D. in child psychology from Columbia University in 1941, of which Columbia has no record. Lewis did send at least one of his children to Yeshiva in the San Fernando Valley.

Career

Acting

His acting career begins the well-documented portion of his life. He worked in burlesque and vaudeville theaters, then on Broadway in the dramas The Night Circus (1958) and One More River (1960) and as the character Moe Shtarker in the musical comedy Do Re Mi (1962).

His earliest television work includes appearances on the crime drama Decoy and The Phil Silvers Show. From 1959 to 1963, he appeared in four episodes of Naked City. Lewis's first well-known television role was as Officer Leo Schnauser on the sitcom Car 54, Where Are You? from 1961 to 1963, also starring Fred Gwynne (Lewis reprised the role in the 1994 movie of the same name). In the series, Lewis first played Al Spencer the Auto Body Man in two early first-season episodes, then landed the more familiar role of Officer Schnauser. He is best remembered as Grandpa on The Munsters, which ran on CBS from 1964 to 1966.

In 1967, Lewis played the part of Zalto the magician in the Lost in Space episode "Rocket to Earth". His first role in a movie was as Machine Gun Manny in Pretty Boy Floyd (1960). He had small roles in The World of Henry Orient (1964), They Shoot Horses, Don't They? (1969), and They Might Be Giants (1971). He appeared as Hanging Judge Harrison in Used Cars (1980), played a security guard on an episode of Taxi, and had a minor role in Married to the Mob (1988). His last film role was in Night Terror (2002).

Lewis was a recurring guest on The Howard Stern Show. In 1987, during a "Howard Stern Freedom Rally" against the Federal Communications Commission (FCC) that was broadcast live, Lewis repeatedly shouted "fuck the FCC!" until Stern was able to take the microphone away from him. Stern and the station were not punished for Lewis's comments.

Unlike some actors, Lewis did not mind being typecast. He enjoyed acting out his Grandpa character—in the original costume—and got a surprising amount of mileage from such a short-lived role. "Why not?" he said. "It pays the bills."

In 1991, he appeared as Grandpa in an episode of Hi Honey, I'm Home on ABC. In 1991, he appeared in a low-budget movie titled Grampire (My Grandpa Is a Vampire in the U.S. version), wearing much the same costume as he did in The Munsters. From 1987 to 1989, Lewis hosted Super Scary Saturday on TBS in his Grandpa outfit. This was parodied in Gremlins 2: The New Batch with the character of Grandpa Fred (Robert Prosky).

Other pursuits
Lewis was a proponent of free speech and frequently spoke out in the late 1980s and early 1990s against government entities such as the FCC (Federal Communications Commission) and non-government entities such as the PMRC (Parents Music Resource Center).  Lewis famously uttered the phrase “(expletive) the FCC”, during a speech at a Manhattan rally organized by radio personality Howard Stern. Stern later used Lewis’ speech as the opening track of Stern's Crucified by the FCC comedy album in early 1991.

Lewis appeared in an episode of The American Experience where he recalled his experiences at Coney Island, which he frequently visited and worked at as a game barker. He was featured in the Atari 7800 videogame Midnight Mutants, an action-adventure title with a Halloween theme. His appearance in the game mirrored his Grandpa persona in The Munsters.

In 1987, he opened an Italian restaurant named Grampa's Bella Gente at 252 Bleecker Street in Manhattan. In September 1989, he licensed a comedy club named Grampa's to an entrepreneurial mafia family named Cataldo in New Dorp Plaza in Staten Island.

Politics
As a left-wing activist, he hosted a politically oriented radio program on WBAI (whose theme song was King Curtis' "Foot Pattin'") and ran as Green Party candidate for governor of New York in 1998. In that race, he sought to be listed on the ballot as Grandpa Al Lewis, arguing that he was most widely known by that name. His request was rejected by the Board of Elections, a decision upheld in court against his challenge.

Despite this setback, he achieved one of his campaign objectives. His total of 52,533 votes exceeded the threshold of votes set by New York law (50,000) and hence guaranteed the Green Party of New York an automatic ballot line for the next four years (see election results, New York governor). He said that, with no political machine and no money backing him, the likelihood of winning the governorship would be "like climbing Mount Everest barefooted". In 2000, he sought the Green Party nomination for US Senate; he ultimately placed second in the primary, with about 32 percent of the vote, losing to Mark Dunau.

Personal life and final years
Lewis married Marge Domowitz in 1956, with whom he had three sons, Dave, Ted, and Paul. The marriage ended in divorce in 1977. In 1984, he married actress Karen Ingenthron, to whom he remained married for the rest of his life.

In his final years, he resided on Roosevelt Island in New York City. In 2003, he was hospitalized for an angioplasty, and complications from the surgery led to an emergency bypass and the amputation of his right leg below the knee as well as all of the toes on his left foot. He died on February 3, 2006, of natural causes in Goldwater Memorial Hospital on Roosevelt Island in New York, NY. The hospital was closed permanently in 2013. Following his body's cremation, his ashes were reportedly "placed in his favorite cigar box."

Filmography

Film

Television

Theatre

Electoral history

References

External links
 
 "Television's Grandpa Munster dies", bbc.co.uk, February 5, 2006
 Shadow Interview, mediafilter.org, October 21, 1997
 Munster Mansion Memorial for Al Lewis, munstermansion.com; accessed September 13, 2015.
 

1923 births
2006 deaths
Male actors from New York City
American male film actors
American male television actors
American radio personalities
New York (state) Greens
Jewish American male actors
Jewish American people in New York (state) politics
American amputees
People from Brownsville, Brooklyn
People from Roosevelt Island
Age controversies
American people of Russian-Jewish descent
20th-century American male actors
21st-century American male actors
Activists from New York (state)
Thomas Jefferson High School (Brooklyn) alumni
20th-century American Jews
21st-century American Jews